Daniel Navarrete may refer to:
 Daniel Navarrete (model)
 Daniel Navarrete (wrestler)